The 2022–23 NIFL Championship (known as the Lough 41 Championship for sponsorship reasons) is the sixth season of the NIFL Championship since gaining senior status. It is the second-tier of the Northern Ireland Football League - the national football league in Northern Ireland. The season began on 13 August 2022 and will conclude on 29 April 2023.

Newry City were the champions of the previous season and promoted to the 2022–23 NIFL Premiership. They were replaced by Warrenpoint Town, who were relegated from the 2021–22 NIFL Premiership. Queen's University were relegated to the 2022–23 NIFL Premier Intermediate League and replaced by Newington, the champions of the 2021–22 NIFL Premier Intermediate League.

Teams

Stadia and locations

League table

Results

Matches 1–22
During matches 1–22 each team plays every other team twice (home and away).

Matches 23–33
During matches 23–33 each team plays every other team for the third time (either at home, or away).

Matches 34–38
For the final five matches, the table splits into two halves, with the top six teams forming Section A and the bottom six teams forming Section B. Each team plays every other team in their respective section once. The fixtures are reversed from those played during rounds 23–33, ensuring that teams have played every other team in their respective section twice at home and twice away overall throughout the season.

NIFL Championship play-off
The eleventh-placed club will face the second-placed club from the 2022–23 NIFL Premier Intermediate League for one place in the following season's Championship.

Season statistics

Top scorers

References

External links

NIFL Championship seasons
Northern Ireland
Current association football seasons